(born February 21, 1944) is a Japanese actor. He had a regular role in the Otoko wa Tsurai yo films, beginning with the first in the series (1969), as Sakura's husband.

Filmography

Film
Otoko wa Tsurai yo series (1969–2019), Hiroshi Suwa
If You Were Young: Rage (1970), Asao
Where Spring Comes Late (1970), Kazami-ryoku
Battles Without Honor and Humanity: Deadly Fight in Hiroshima (1973), Koichi Shimada
Mount Hakkoda (1977), Saitō
Hometown (1983), Teacher Tani
Final Take (1986), Yuki's husband
No Worries on the Recruit Front (1991), Interviewer
Pride (1998), Sadao Akamatsu
Break Through! (2005), Motoki's father
The Floating Castle (2012), Tahee
Little Maestra (2012), Tatsuji Minatogawa
Midsummer's Equation (2013), Shigeharu Kawabata
R100 (2013), Kiichirō Sugiura
March Comes in Like a Lion (2017), Someji Kawamoto

Television
Three Outlaw Samurai (1968)
Mito Kōmon (1971–2011)
Ōoka Echizen (1971)
Ronin of the Wilderness (1972)
Hissatsu Shiokinin (1973), Danjōshōhitsu Hatakeyama
Tasukenin Hashiru (1974), Takichi
Edo no Kaze (1975–1976)
Taiyō ni Hoero! (1975)
A Woman and the Beancurd Soup (1976)
Edo no Uzu (1978)
Kinpachi-sensei (1988), Kazutomo Abe
Moeyo Ken (1990), Serizawa Kamo
Wataru Seken wa Oni Bakari (1990–2017), Ryō Noda
Kōmyō ga Tsuji (2006)
Smile (2009), Sosuke Machimura
Nobunaga Concerto (2015), Village head
Massan (2014–2015), Masashi Kameyama
Naotora: The Lady Warlord (2017), Ii Naohira

References

External links

Japanese male actors
Living people
1944 births
Place of birth missing (living people)